Wendell Wynn Meldrum (June 27, 1924 – February 13, 2013) was a Canadian politician. He served in the Legislative Assembly of New Brunswick from 1965 to 1974 as member of the Liberal party.

References

1924 births
2013 deaths